This is a glossary list of opera genres, giving alternative names.

"Opera" is an Italian word (short for "opera in musica"); it was not at first commonly used in Italy (or in other countries) to refer to the genre of particular works. Most composers used more precise designations to present their work to the public. Often specific genres of opera were commissioned by theatres or patrons (in which case the form of the work might deviate more or less from the genre norm, depending on the inclination of the composer). Opera genres are not exclusive. Some operas are regarded as belonging to several.

Definitions
Opera genres have been defined in different ways, not always in terms of stylistic rules. Some, like opera seria, refer to traditions identified by later historians, and others, like Zeitoper, have been defined by their own inventors. Other forms have been associated with a particular theatre, for example opéra comique at the theatre of the same name, or opéra bouffe at the Théâtre des Bouffes Parisiens.

This list does not include terms that are vague and merely descriptive, such as "comic opera", "sacred opera", "tragic opera" or "one-act opera" etc. Original language terms are given to avoid the ambiguities that would be caused by English translations.

List

See also
 Operas by genre
The following cover other forms of entertainment that existed around the time of the appearance of the first operas in Italy at the end of the 16th century, which were influential in the development of the art form:
 Intermedio
 Masque
 Madrigale concertato
 Madrigal comedy

References

 
 
Genres